Loma Pytá  is a barrio of Asunción, Paraguay.

Neighbourhoods of Asunción